The women's 50 metre freestyle event at the 2014 Commonwealth Games as part of the swimming programme took place on 25 and 26 July at the Tollcross International Swimming Centre in Glasgow, Scotland.

The medals were presented by Alison Sheppard, 2002 Commonwealth champion and the quaichs were presented by Francis Paul, Secretary-General of the National Olympic Committee of Kenya.

Records
Prior to this competition, the existing world and Commonwealth Games records were as follows.

The following records were established during the competition:

Results

Heats

Semifinals

Final

References

External links

Women's 050 metre freestyle
Commonwealth Games
2014 in women's swimming